Nielestno  is a village in the administrative district of Gmina Wleń, within Lwówek Śląski County, Lower Silesian Voivodeship, in south-western Poland. Prior to 1945 it was in Germany.

Further reading 
 Horst Knobloch: Waltersdorf. Dziś Nielestno. Kronika Horsta Knoblocha. Z niemieckiego przełożyła Izabela Taraszczuk. Beverstedt: Wydawnictwo własne 2013.
 Horst Knobloch: Waltersdorf. Heute Nielestno. Chronik von Horst Knobloch. Beverstedt: Eigenverlag 2013.
 Izabela Taraszczuk: Bemerkenswertes aus Waltersdorf. Heimatchronik vorgestellt und Gefallenendenkmal saniert. In: "Schlesien heute", No 6/2013. Görlitz: Senfkorn Verlag Alfred Theisen 2013, pp. 56–57.

References

Villages in Lwówek Śląski County